The Staufenmauer was an old city wall of Frankfurt am Main, Germany.

As part of the fortification of Frankfurt, it was built in 1180 under the Hohenstaufen rule to protect the city from attack and surround the present Altstadt.  When the city was expanded in 1333, the old wall became a victim of efforts to reorganize the city defenses.

Today one can still see a small portion along the Fahrgasse, a part that was restored after the 18th century fire in the Jewish Ghetto.

Buildings and structures in Frankfurt
History of Frankfurt
Tourist attractions in Frankfurt
City walls in Germany
Frankfurt-Altstadt